Seega may refer to:

Seega (game), board game from Egypt
Seega (Thuringia), village in Thuringia